Christiansted is the largest town on Saint Croix, one of the main islands composing the United States Virgin Islands, a territory of the United States of America. The town is named after King Christian VI of Denmark.

History
The town was founded by Frederick Moth after he was made governor of St. Croix in 1733. Departing from St. Thomas, Capt. Moth's party had cleared a space for Fort Christianswærn by 5 September. In a ceremony next to this fort on 8 Jan. 1734, the French formally handed over the island to the Danes in the form of the Danish West India and Guinea Company. The island was to be allotted 300 plantations, 215 for sugar and the remainder for cotton. The plantations surveyed were 3000 feet by 2000 feet. In addition, the company established a sugar refinery and distillery. The fort was completed by 1740. The 1742 census listed 120 sugar plantations, 122 cotton plantations, and 1,906 slaves compared to about 300 Englishmen and 60 Danes. By 1743, the island had a hospital and in 1745, the number of slaves had increased to 2878. By 1754, the town included 83 "white inhabitants", "each of whom owned from a single slave to sixty-six of them," according to Westergaard. Total slaves on the island had increased to 7566.

It is a former capital of the Danish West Indies and home to the Christiansted National Historic Site. Christiansted has preserved the 18th-century Danish-style buildings constructed by African slaves. Solid stone buildings in pastel colors with bright red tile roofs line the cobblestone sidewalks, adding a touch of 18th-century European architectural style. Because the town was constructed by African slaves, there are many African influences in Christiansted's design as well, making it one of the few "African-Danish" towns in the world. The town's symmetry, with streets running at right angles to the waterfront, makes it popular for walking tours. The commercial area centers on King and Company streets, adjacent to the Christiansted National Historic Site. The residential area, including portions that were originally settlements for free blacks, extends inland and uphill from the commercial area. The botanist Julius von Rohr started a botanic garden in the 18th century and produced a number of landscapes of the island.

The town has small hotels and many restaurants. Several scuba shops operate in the town, as the wharf has easy access to many diving attractions on the north side of the island. A small point of interest is Protestant Cay, a cay near Christiansted.

Economy

With a small population, the economy of Christiansted is not extremely vast. Christiansted as of 2004, had a population of about 3,000. The 2000 census population of the town was 2,637; that of the larger sub-district was 2,865.

Seaborne Airlines previously had headquarters in Christiansted.

Transportation
The city of Christiansted is served by one commercial airport, Henry E. Rohlsen Airport, with flights on several airlines, including American and Delta from the United States.

A ferry serving the Hotel on the Cay resort runs between Christiansted and Protestant Cay.

Education
Public schools serving the community are operated by the St. Croix School District.

Climate 
Christiansted features a tropical savanna climate (Koppen Aw/As).

Notable people 
 Judah P. Benjamin, a Confederate politician and a seminal figure in the United States Civil War, was born in Christiansted while it was still a Danish colony.
 NBA player Tim Duncan (two-time MVP, five-time NBA champion) is a native.
 Alexander Hamilton was a resident in 1765 after leaving his birthplace of Charlestown, Nevis at age 11. Upon reaching 17 years old, he moved from the then-Danish Virgin Islands to New York City and never returned to the Caribbean.
 Victor Borge was a long-time resident of Christiansted
 Audre Lorde died in Christiansted on November 17, 1992 at the age of 58. She was a famous poet.
 Carolyn Carter was born in Christiansted and is a model and beauty queen.
 "Queen" Mary Thomas one of the leaders of the fireburn riots, was imprisoned here from 1887 to 1905.
 Casper Holstein, a mobster involved in the Harlem "numbers rackets", was born in Christiansted in 1876.

Gallery

Notes

References
 Lonely Planet's Cities Book: A Journey Through the Best Cities in the World p. 159.

External links

 Christiansted National Historic Site (National Park Service)
 

Populated places in Saint Croix, U.S. Virgin Islands
Towns in the United States Virgin Islands
Sub-districts of Saint Croix, U.S. Virgin Islands
Populated places established in 1744